Paul Nosch (date of birth unknown) was a footballer who played as forward or midfielder in the early 1900s.

Football career
Nosch joined FC Basel's first team for their 1901–02 season, before he had played for their second team, who at that time played in the Serie B, the second tier of Swiss football. Nosch played his domestic league debut for the first team in the away game on 17 November 1901 as Basel were defeated 0–2 by Young Boys. Nosch played one more friendly game for the first team that season. This was an away game in Mulhouse as Basel won 3–1 against French team FC Mulhouse on 26 January 1902. There were various other members of the second team who also played in this game.

In their 1902–03 season Nosch also played two games with the first team, but in the following season he returned to the second team. During his time with the first team Nosched played a total of four games for Basel without scoring a goal. Three of these games were in the Seie A and one was a friendly game.

References

Sources
 Rotblau: Jahrbuch Saison 2017/2018. Publisher: FC Basel Marketing AG. 
 Die ersten 125 Jahre. Publisher: Josef Zindel im Friedrich Reinhardt Verlag, Basel. 
 Verein "Basler Fussballarchiv" Homepage

FC Basel players
Association football midfielders
Association football forwards
Swiss Super League players
Date of birth missing
Date of death missing
Swiss men's footballers